Maladera is a genus in the beetle family Scarabaeidae, containing species such as Maladera insanabilis and Maladera castanea. There are at least 480 described species in Maladera.

See also
 List of Maladera species

References

External links
 Maladera castanea on the UF / IFAS Featured Creatures website.

Scarabaeidae genera
Melolonthinae